Manfred Steiner (born 1962) is an Austrian Ski Jumper.

Manfred Steiner may also refer to:

Manfred Steiner (physician) (born 1932), Austrian-American hematologist and physicist
Manfred Steiner (footballer) (1950–2020), an Austrian footballer